Leptodactylodon perreti is a species of frog in the family Arthroleptidae. It is endemic to Cameroon and restricted to the central Cameroon Range. Common name Perret's egg frog has been coined for it.

Etymology
The specific name perreti honours , a Swiss herpetologist who has specialized in African amphibians.

Habitat and conservation
Its natural habitats are forests primarily in montane, and to a lesser extent submontane zone. It is threatened by habitat loss.

References

perreti
Frogs of Africa
Amphibians of Cameroon
Endemic fauna of Cameroon
Amphibians described in 1971
Taxonomy articles created by Polbot
Fauna of the Cameroonian Highlands forests